Numerous civilians, including men, women, children, government officials, activists, secular intellectuals and clerics have been victims of assassination, terrorism, or violence against non-combatants, over the course of modern Iranian history.

Several Iranian prime ministers, president, and ministers were assassinated by militant groups during the 20th century. Some notable victims are Prime Ministers Mohammad Javad Bahonar, Shapour Bakhtiar, Amir-Abbas Hoveida, Abdolhossein Hazhir and Haj Ali Razmara; President Mohammad Ali Rajai; Head of Judiciary Mohammad Beheshti; Chief Commander of the Army Ali Sayad Shirazi; and Minister of Labor Dariush Forouhar.

The 1978 Cinema Rex fire and the 1990s chain murders of Iran are among the most notable acts of terrorism in Iran.

Attacks on Iranians

Assassinations in Qajar era
Shah Mohammad Khan Qajar was assassinated in 1797 in the city of Susa (Shusha), the capital of Karabakh khanate, after about 16 years in power. While Mohammad Khan Qajar's assassination might be called part of the ancient practice of palace intrigue, or motivated simply fear and/or revenge, the May 1, 1896, killing of Shah Nasser al-Din Shah Qajar conforms more closely to the modern phenomenon of terrorism as a tool of a political movement. Nasser al-Din was shot and killed by Mirza Reza Kermani, a follower of Jamal al-Din al-Afghani, an early promoter of modern Pan-Islamism. Al-Afghani is reported to have said of the assassination, “surely it was a good deed to kill this bloodthirsty tyrant.”

Fadayan-e Islam

Fadayan-e Islam was an Islamic fundamentalist secret society founded in Iran in 1946, by "a charismatic theology student" named Navab Safavi. Safavi sought to "purify Islam" in Iran by ridding it of "corrupting individuals" by means of carefully planned assassinations of certain leading intellectual and political figures. Some of its targets in the late 1940s and early 1950s included secularist author Ahmad Kasravi, former premier Abdul-Hussein Hazhir, Education and Culture Minister Ahmad Zangeneh, and Prime Minister Haj-Ali Razmara. Such was the groups influence and success that it was able to use its powerful clerical supporters to free its assassins from punishment.  In the mid-1950s, after the consolidation of the power of the Shah, the group was suppressed and Safavi executed. The group survived as supporters of the Ayatollah Khomeini and the Islamic Revolution of Iran.

1978 Cinema Rex fire

On 19 August 1978, in the midst of the Iranian Revolution, more than 420 people were killed when the Cinema Rex in Abadan, Iran was set on fire during a showing of the movie The Deers. It was eventually uncovered that Islamic militants had set the cinema on fire.

Attacks by Mujahedin-e-Khalq
 

On 28 June 1981, bombs set by the People's Mujahedin of Iran (MeK) killed 70 high-ranking officials of the Islamic Republic Party, including Chief Justice Mohammad Beheshti who was the second highest official after Ayatollah Khomeini at the time. Two years after the Islamic Revolution of Iran, the MeK detonated bombs at the headquarters of the now-dissolved Islamic Republic Party. Two months later, the MeK detonated another bomb in the office of the president, killing President Rajai and Premier Mohammad Javad Bahonar.

The 1998 Chain murders

Since the founding of the Islamic Republic, dissidents in Iran have complained of unsolved murders and disappearances of intellectuals and political activists who had been critical of the Islamic Republic system in some way. In 1998 these complaints came to a head with the killing of three dissident writers, political leader Dariush Forouhar and his wife in the span of two months, in what became known as the Chain Murders or 1998 Serial Murders of Iran. The deputy security official of the Ministry of Information,  Saeed Emami, was arrested for the killings and later committed suicide, although many believe higher level officials were responsible for the killings.   According to Iranterror.com, "it was widely assumed that [Emami] was murdered in order to prevent the leak of sensitive information about Ministry of Intelligence and Security operations, which would have compromised the entire leadership of the Islamic Republic."

Attacks by Taliban and Sunni extremists

1994 Mashhad bombing

On June 20, 1994, the explosion of a bomb in a prayer hall of Imam Reza shrine in Mashhad killed at least 25 people. The Iranian government officially blamed Mujahedin-e-Khalq for the incident to avoid sectarian conflict between Shias and Sunnis. However, the Pakistani daily The News International reported on March 27, 1995, "Pakistani investigators have identified a 24-year-old religious fanatic Abdul Shakoor residing in Lyari in Karachi, as an important Pakistani associate of Ramzi Yousef.  Abdul Shakoor had intimate contacts with Ramzi Ahmed Yousef  and was responsible for the June 20, 1994, massive bomb explosion at the shrine Imam Ali Reza in Mashhad." According to the Jamestown Foundation Terrorism Monitor, "a report produced by the [Iranian] Ministry of Intelligence in October 1994 identified the culprits as operatives of Pakistan's Lashkar-e-Jhangvi the sister organization of Sipah-e-Sahaba."

1998 Mazar-i-Sharif killings

On August 8, 1998, the Taliban, assisted by Al-Qaeda, attacked the Afghan city of Mazar-i-Sharif, killing 11 Iranian diplomats and journalists along with thousands of Afghan civilians, in what was considered an attack motivated by takfir against Shias.

More infuriating for Iran was the fact that Pakistan's ISI had guaranteed their security.
Tehran had earlier contacted the Pakistan government to guarantee the security of their Consulate, because the Iranians knew that ISI officers had driven into Mazar with the Taliban. The Iranians had thought that Dost Mohammed's unit had been sent to protect them so had welcomed them at first. .... At first the Taliban refused to admit the whereabouts of the diplomats but then as international protests and Iranian fury increased, they admitted that the diplomats had been killed, not on official orders but by renegade Taliban. But reliable sources said that Dost Mohammed had spoken to Mullah Omar on his wireless to ask whether the diplomats should be killed and Omar had given the go-ahead."

Iran was also angry at the lack of support from Western countries, particularly America, which considered Iran an enemy. Referring to the attack, Iranian Supreme Leader Khamenei alleges that "neither the Americans, nor the Europeans, who are now pursuing Al-Qaeda agents as members of the most dangerous terror organization, showed any reaction at all."

The Taliban were also thought to have "secretly" backed anti-regime Iranian groups. These groups received weapons and support from the Taliban and "Iranians were convinced that the Pakistanis were also sponsoring them." The group sought to overthrow the Shia Iranian government, despite the fact that Iran was overwhelmingly Shia.

Iran responded to the killings by putting its forces on alert and moving troops to the Afghan border, though tensions would subside.

Jundallah (since 2003)

Jundallah, a Sunni Islamist Baloch insurgent organization based in Balochistan, claims to be fighting for the rights of Sunni in Iran. It is believed to have 1,000 fighters and claims to have killed 400 Iranian soldiers. The group has been identified as a terrorist organization by Iran and Pakistan and many believe it is linked to Al-Qaeda. It is also believed to receive support from the US government.

2007 Zahedan bombing

A car filled with explosives stopped in front of a bus full of Revolutionary Guards in Ahmabad district, Zahedan, Sistan-Baluchestan Province at 6:30 a.m. on 14 February 2007. The car, parked in the middle of the road, forced the bus to stop. The car's driver and passengers then got out of the car and used motorbikes to leave the scene while they shot at the bus. A few seconds later the bombs exploded, killing 18 Guards. Guards commander Qasem Rezaei said, "This blind terrorist operation led to the martyrdom of 18 citizens of Zahedan." Rezaei attributed the attack to "insurgents and elements of insecurity." Majid Razavi, an Interior Ministry official, said Iranian police arrested a suspect within an hour of the bombing.

Jundallah, an organization some alleged to be affiliated with Al Qaeda, claimed responsibility for the attack on 15 February and said it is retaliation for the executions of those accused of carrying out the Ahvaz Bombings. The Iranian government has arrested five suspects, two of whom were carrying camcorders and grenades when they were arrested, while the police killed the main "agent" of the attack.

Hossein Ali Shahriari, Zahedan's representative in parliament, rhetorically asked, "Why does our diplomatic apparatus not seriously confront the Pakistani government for harboring bandits and regime's enemies? Why do security, military and police officials not take more serious action?"

2005 Ahvaz bombings

The Ahvaz bombings were a series of bombings that took place mostly in Ahvaz. The bombings were linked to previous suppression of the Arab unrest in Ahvaz, occurred earlier in 2005. The first bombing came ahead of the presidential election on 12 June. Interior Ministry official Mohammad Hussein Motahar said at the time:
Two bombs were hidden in toilets within the building of the Ministry of Housing and Urban Development and at the Office of Construction and Civil Engineering. The third bomb exploded in front of the house of the governor of Khuzestan Province. All three of these explosions were in the city center of Ahvaz. Another bomb was hidden in the doorway of the house of a [state] radio and television official in Ahvaz. The bomb went off when the door was opened.

2008 Shiraz bombing

A terrorist bombing inside a mosque in Shiraz in April 2008 killed 14 people including 10 men, 2 women and 2 children. More than 200 were also injured. Responsibility for the attack has not been determined.

2008 convoy bombing
According to Western news reports, at least 15 people were killed and scores wounded in a July 2008 explosion in Tehran. Initially there was a news black-out on the explosion in Iran and Revolutionary Guards launched an investigation into the causes of the blast and the possibility that sabotage was involved. There had been "a number of unexplained explosions in recent months." The convoy was reported to be carrying arms for Hezbollah when it exploded.

2010 Chabahar suicide bombing

2010 Chabahar suicide bombing was carried out on December 14, 2010, by two suicide bombers, who blew themselves up in the crowded Shiite Muslim mourning procession in Southeastern Iranian coastal city of Chabahar outside Imam Husain Mosque. The bombings took place in the day of Tasua, when Shiite Muslims gathered there to commemorate the martyrdom of Husayn ibn Ali, the grandson of Muhammad. The bombing resulted in killing at least 38 people.

2010–2012 scientist assassinations

Four Iranian nuclear scientists were assassinated between 2010 and 2012, and a fifth was wounded in a failed assassination attempt.  The Iranian government has accused Israel of committing the attacks, a claim which Israel has denied.

2017 Tehran attacks

On 7 June 2017, multiple attacks were reported across Iran's capital city Tehran, including a shooting in the Iranian parliament and a suicide bombing at the Mausoleum of Ayatollah Khomeini. The attacks appear to have been coordinated. The last major terror attack in Iran was the 2010 Chabahar suicide bombing.

2018 Ahvaz attack

On 22 September 2018, a military parade was attacked in Ahvaz, a southwestern Iranian city.

2018 Chabahar suicide bombing

On 6 December 2018, a suicide bomber detonated his car near a police station killing two policemen and wounding dozens more.

See also
 Iran and state terrorism
 New Great Game

References

 
Human rights abuses in Iran
Iran
Terrorism in Asia